Smisek is a surname. Notable people with the surname include:

Jeff Smisek (born 1954), American businessman and investor
Mirek Smíšek (1925–2013), Czechoslovakian-born New Zealand potter
Petr Smíšek (born 1978), Czech footballer
Sandra Smisek (born 1977), German footballer